Ankara is the capital of Turkey.

Ankara may also refer to:

Places and establishments 
Ankara Province in Turkey
Ankara University
Battle of Ankara
Ankara Central railway station
Ankara Vilayet
Ankara Eyalet
Ankara Demirspor
Treaty of Ankara (disambiguation)
Ankara Castle
Ankara River
Greater Ankara

Other 

 African wax prints, also known as "Ankara"
1457 Ankara, an asteroid

See also
Angara (disambiguation)
Angora (disambiguation)